Madeleine Hartog-Bel (born January, 11 1946) is a Peruvian model and beauty queen who won the 1967 Miss World contest, representing Peru. After making it to the semi-finals of the Miss Universe pageant in 1966, she went on to win the Miss World title in London, UK the following year.

Personal life
After Miss World, she lived in Paris, France for many years, and now she resides in a South Florida island. She is married and has a daughter. In 1967 she appeared in Bob Hope's Christmas special entertaining the troops in Vietnam.

References

1946 births
Living people
Miss Universe 1966 contestants
Miss World winners
Miss World 1967 delegates
Peruvian beauty pageant winners
Peruvian emigrants to France
People from Arequipa
Peruvian emigrants to the United States